Gordon F. Derner (1915–1983) was an American psychologist. He was the dean of the Institute of Advanced Psychological Studies (since renamed after him) at Adelphi University. He received the Bruno Klopfer Award in 1982.

He was born on April 9, 1915 in Buffalo, New York.

He graduated from the State University at Buffalo, and held a master's degree and a doctorate from Columbia University.

References 

20th-century American psychologists
1915 births
1983 deaths
Adelphi University faculty
Scientists from Buffalo, New York
Columbia University alumni
University at Buffalo alumni